Demand forecasting is known as the process of making future estimations in relation to customer demand over a specific period. Generally, demand forecasting will consider historical data and other analytical information to produce the most accurate predictions. More specifically, the methods of demand forecasting entails using predictive analytics of historical data to understand and predict customer demand in order to understand key economic conditions and assist in making crucial supply decisions to optimise business profitability.  Demand forecasting methods are divided into two major categories, qualitative and quantitative methods. Qualitative methods are based on expert opinion and information gathered from the field. It is mostly used in situations when there is minimal data available to analyse. For example, when a business or product is newly being introduced to the market. Quantitative methods however, use data, and analytical tools in order to create predictions. Demand forecasting may be used in production planning, inventory management, and at times in assessing future capacity requirements, or in making decisions on whether to enter a new market.

Importance of demand forecasting for business 
Demand forecasting plays an important role for businesses in different industries, particularly in reducing risk in business activities. However, it is known to be a challenge that companies face due to the intricacies of analysis, specifically quantitative analysis. Yet, understanding customer needs is an indispensable part of any industry, so that business plans can be implemented more efficiently and can more appropriately respond to market needs. If businesses begin to master the concept of demand forecasting, it can result in several benefits. These include, but are not limited to, waste reduction, more optimal allocation of resources and potentially dramatic increases in sales and revenue. 

With more detail, some of the reasons as to why businesses need demand forecasting include:

 Meeting goals - Most successful organisations will have pre-determined growth trajectories and long-term plans to ensure the business is operating at optimal abilities. By having an understanding of future demand markets, businesses can be proactive in ensuring their meeting goals are in line with industry growth trends.
 Business decisions - In reference to meeting goals, by having a thorough understanding of future industry demand, management and key board members can make strategic business decisions that can achieve higher profitability and business growth. These decisions are generally associated with the concepts of capacity, market targeting, raw materials and understanding vendor contract direction. 
 Growth - By having an accurate understanding of future forecasts, companies can gauge the need for expansion within a timeframe that allows them to do so cost effectively.
 Human capital management - Given demand forecasting will generally discloses information surrounding technology growth and production, businesses can benefit from planning employee training to ensure staff are well equipped for new technology trends. This will assist in ensuring an organisation can operate optimally.
 Financial planning - It is crucial to understand demand forecasts in order to efficiently budget for future operations. A strong demand forecast will assist to disclose potential future costs and revenues.

Methods for Forecasting Demand 
There are various statistical and econometric analyses used to forecast demand. Forecasting demand can be broken down into seven stage process, the seven stages are described as:

Stage 1: Statement of a theory or hypothesis 
The first step to forecast demand is to determine a set of objectives or information to derive different business strategies (find journal). These objectives are based on a set of hypotheses which usually come from a mixture of economic theory or previous empirical studies. For example, a manager may wish to find what the optimal price and production amount would be for a new product, based on how demand elasticity affected past company sales.

Stage 2: Model Specification 
There are many different econometric models which differ depending on the analysis that managers wish to perform. The type of model that is chosen to forecast demand depends on many different aspects such as the type of data obtained or the number of observations, etc. In this stage it is important to define the type of variables that will be used to forecast demand. Regression analysis is the main statistical method for forecasting. There are many different types of regression analysis but fundamentally, they provide an analysis of how one or multiple variables affect the dependent variable being measured. An example of a model for forecasting demand is M.Roodman’s (1986) demand forecasting regression model for measuring the seasonality affects on a data point being measured. The model was based on a linear regression model, and is used to measure linear trends based on seasonal cycles and their affects on demand ie. the seasonal demand for a product based on sales in summer and winter.

The linear regression model is described as:

M.Roodman’s demand forecasting model is based on linear regression and is described as:

 is defined as the set of all  - indices for quarter . The process that generates the data for all periods  that fall in quarter  is given by:

  = the datum for period 
  = base demand at the beginning of the time series horizon
  = the linear trend per quarter
  = the multiplicative seasonal factor for quarter
  = a disturbance term

Stage 3: Data Collection 
Once the type of model is specified in stage 2, the data and the method of collecting data must be specified. The model must be specified first in order to determine the variables which need to be collected. Conversely, when deciding on the desired forecasting model, the available data or methods to collect data needs to be considered in order to formulate the correct model. Time series data and cross section data are the different collection methods that can be used. Time series data are based on historical observations taken sequentially in time. These observations are used to derive relevant statistics, characteristics, and insight from the data. The data points that may be collected using time series data may be sales, prices, manufacturing costs and their corresponding time intervals i.e., weekly, monthly, quarterly, annually or any other regular interval.  Cross section data refers to data collected on a single entity at different periods of time. Cross sectional data used in demand forecasting usually depicts a data point gathered from an individual, firm, industry or an area. For example, sales for Firm A during quarter 1. This type of data encapsulates a variety of data points which resulted in the final data point. The subset of data points may not be observable or feasible to determine but can be practical method for adding precision to the demand forecast model. The source for the data can be found via the firm’s records, commercial or private agencies or official sources.

Stage 4: Estimation of Parameters 
Once the model and data are obtained then computing the values to determine the affects the independent variables have on the dependant variable in focus. Using the linear regression model as an example of estimating parameters, the following steps are taken:  

Linear regression formula: 

  

The first step is to find the line that minimizes the sum of the squares of the difference between the observed values of the dependent variable and the fitted values from the line.

 and  also need to be represented to fine the intercept and slope of the line. The method for omitting these variables are described below:

Stage 5: Checking the Accuracy of the Model 
Calculating demand forecast accuracy is the process of determining the accuracy of forecasts made regarding customer demand for a product. Understanding and predicting customer demand is vital to manufacturers and distributors to avoid stock-outs and maintain adequate inventory levels.  While forecasts are never perfect, they are necessary to prepare for actual demand. In order to maintain an optimized inventory and effective supply chain, accurate demand forecasts are imperative.

Calculating the accuracy of supply chain forecasts 
Forecast accuracy in the supply chain is typically measured using the Mean Absolute Percent Error or MAPE. Statistically MAPE is defined as the average of percentage errors. 

Most practitioners, however, define and use the MAPE as the Mean Absolute Deviation divided by Average Sales, which is just a volume weighted MAPE, also referred to as the MAD/Mean ratio. This is the same as dividing the sum of the absolute deviations by the total sales of all products. This calculation , where  is the actual value and  the forecast, is also known as WAPE, Weighted Absolute Percent Error. 

Another interesting option is the weighted 
. The advantage of this measure is that could weight errors, so you can define how to weight for your relevant business, ex gross profit or ABC. The only problem is that for seasonal products you will create an undefined result when sales = 0 and that is not symmetrical, that means that you can be much more inaccurate if sales are higher than if they are lower than the forecast. So sMAPE is also used to correct this, it is known as symmetric Mean Absolute Percentage Error.

Last but not least, for intermittent demand patterns none of the above are really useful. So you can consider MASE (Mean Absolute Scaled Error) as a good KPI to use in those situations, the problem is that is not as intuitive as the ones mentioned before. Another metric to consider, especially when there are intermittent or lumpy demand patterns at hand, is SPEC (Stock-keeping-oriented Prediction Error Costs). The idea behind this metric is to compare predicted demand and actual demand by computing theoretical incurred costs over the forecast horizon. It assumes, that predicted demand higher than actual demand results in stock-keeping costs, whereas predicted demand lower than actual demand results in opportunity costs. SPEC takes into account temporal shifts (prediction before or after actual demand) or cost-related aspects and allows comparisons between demand forecasts based on business aspects as well.

Calculating forecast error 
The forecast error needs to be calculated using actual sales as a base. There are several forms of forecast error calculation methods used, namely Mean Percent Error, Root Mean Squared Error, Tracking Signal and Forecast Bias.

Stage 6: Hypothesis testing 
Once the model has been determined, the model is used to test the theory or hypothesis stated in the first stage. The results should describe what is trying to be achieved and determine if the theory or hypothesis is true or false. In relation to the example provided in the first stage, the model should show the relationship between demand elasticity of the market and the correlation it has to past company sales. This should enable managers to make an informed decisions regarding the optimal price and production amount for the new product.

Stage 7: Forecasting 
The final step is to then forecast demand based on the data set and model created. In order to forecast demand, estimations of a chosen variable are used to see the affects it has on demand. Regarding estimating the chosen variable, a regression model can be used or both qualitative and quantitative assessments can be implemented. Examples of qualitative and quantitative assessments are:

Qualitative assessment 
 Unaided judgment
 Prediction market
 Delphi technique
 Game theory
 Judgmental bootstrapping
 Simulated interaction
 Intentions and expectations survey
 jury of executive method

Quantitative assessment 
 Discrete event simulation
 Extrapolation
 Group method of data handling (GMDH)
 Reference class forecasting
 Quantitative analogies
 Rule-based forecasting
 Neural networks
 Data mining
 Conjoint analysis
 Causal models
 Segmentation
 Exponential smoothing models
 Box–Jenkins models
 Hybrid models

Others
Others include:

See also 
 Supply and demand
 Demand chain
 Demand Modeling
 Elasticity of Demand
 
 Reference class forecasting
 Consensus forecasts
 Optimism bias
 Production budget

References

Bibliography 
 Milgate, Murray (March 2008). "Goods and commodities". In Steven N. Durlauf and Lawrence E. Blume. The New Palgrave Dictionary of Economics (2nd ed.). Palgrave Macmillan. pp. 546–48. . Retrieved 2010-03-24.
 Montani, Guido (1987). "Scarcity". In Eatwell, J. Millgate, M., Newman, P. The New Palgrave. A Dictionary of Economics 4. Palgrave, Houndsmill. pp. 253–54.

Statistical forecasting
Demand
Supply chain management